The Chippewa River is a  tributary of the Minnesota River in western and southwestern Minnesota in the United States.  Via the Minnesota River, it is part of the watershed of the Mississippi River.

The river was named after the Chippewa Indians.

Course

The Chippewa River passes through several more lakes in its upper course. It initially flows westwardly into Grant County, where it turns generally southward for the remainder of its course through Pope, Stevens, Swift and Chippewa counties. The river passes the towns of Hoffman, Cyrus and Benson; it joins the Minnesota River in Montevideo. Some sections of the river, especially along its middle course in Pope and Swift Counties, have been straightened and channelized.

At Watson, Minnesota, the river has an average flow of 236 cubic feet per second.

See also
 List of rivers of Minnesota
 List of longest streams of Minnesota

References

 Columbia Gazetteer of North America entry
 DeLorme (1994).  Minnesota Atlas & Gazetteer.  Yarmouth, Maine: DeLorme.  .

External links

Rivers of Minnesota
Rivers of Chippewa County, Minnesota
Rivers of Douglas County, Minnesota
Rivers of Pope County, Minnesota
Rivers of Stevens County, Minnesota
Rivers of Swift County, Minnesota
Tributaries of the Minnesota River